Antonio Loredan (1420 – August 1482) was a member of the Venetian noble family of Loredan, captain of Venetian-held Scutari (Shkodër in modern Albania) and governor in Split (Venetian Dalmatia), Albania Veneta, and the Morea.

Family 

Antonio Loredan was born into the Santa Maria branch of the noble House of Loredan. His wife was Orsa (Orsola) Pisani, with whom he had three sons: Giovanni, Marco and Jacopo.

Morea and Dalmatia 

In 1466 Loredan was governor in the Morea. In the period 1467—69 he was a governor of Split in Venetian Dalmatia.

Albania Veneta 
Loredan was appointed as captain of Scutari and governor of Albania Veneta on 12 July 1473.

He was one of Venetian military commanders  during the Siege of Shkodra (1474). According to some sources, when Scutari garrison complained for lack of food and water, Loredan told them "If you are hungry, here is my flesh; if you are thirsty, I give you my blood."

Because of the successful defense of the city he was considered a war hero. Venetian government awarded Loredan with title of "Knight of San Marco". To celebrate this victory Venetians decided on 4 September 1474 to construct a hospital.

Cyprus and Venice 
After successful defense of Scutari, Loredan was ordered by the Venetian government to seize Cyprus and garrison its castles after destroying Ottoman forts on Bojana first. The purpose of this move was to prevent the Republic of Genoa to use unstable situation at Cyprus and capture it first.

In 1478 Loredan was elected as a Procurator of San Marco. He died of marsh fever in 1482, during the War of Ferrara.

In literature and the arts 
Loredan is mentioned in many works of literature, such as those authored by Stjepan Mitrov Ljubiša and Marin Barleti.

References

External links 
 George Merula The Siege of Shkodra (1474) - published on the website of Robert Elsie

1420 births
1482 deaths
Republic of Venice military personnel
Antonio
Procurators of Saint Mark